Good conduct time, good time credit, good time, or time off for good behavior is a sentence reduction given to prisoners who maintain good behavior while imprisoned. Good time can be forfeited if a prisoner is determined to have committed disciplinary infractions and/or crimes while incarcerated.

Under United States federal law, prisoners serving more than one year in prison get 54 days a year of good time on the anniversary of each year they serve plus the pro rata good time applied to a partial year served at the end of their sentence, at the rate of 54 days per year.

Persistent controversy over calculation of good conduct time in the United States was laid to rest in the Supreme Court decision in Barber v. Thomas in 2010. The First Step Act, which provides for time credits for successful participation in recidivism reduction programs, also changes how the 54 days are calculated, applying a retroactive fix that could result in the release of 4,000 prisoners.

References

External links 
Good Time and Earned Time Policies for State Prison Inmates

Legal terminology
United States sentencing law